In May 2014, the Government of the People's Republic of China (PRC) launched the "Strike Hard Campaign against Violent Terrorism" in the far west province of Xinjiang. It is an aspect of the Xinjiang conflict, the ongoing struggle by the Chinese Communist Party (CCP) and the Chinese government to manage the ethnically diverse and tumultuous province. According to critics, the CCP and the Chinese government have used the global "war on terror" of the 2000s to frame separatist and ethnic unrest as acts of Islamist terrorism to legitimize its counter-insurgency policies in Xinjiang. Chinese officials have maintained that the campaign is essential for national security purposes.

Different "Strike Hard" campaigns had been mounted by regional authorities in the 1990s.

Background 
In April 2010, after the July 2009 Ürümqi riots, Zhang Chunxian replaced the former CCP chief Wang Lequan, who had been behind religious policies in Xinjiang for 14 years. Zhang Chunxian continued Wang's policy and even strengthened them. In 2011, Zhang proposed "modern culture leads the development in Xinjiang" as his policy statement. In 2012, he first mentioned the phrase "de-extremification" (Chinese: 去极端化) campaigns. Under General Secretary of the Chinese Communist Party Xi Jinping, the Chinese government began scaling up its military presence in the region and introducing more stringent restrictions on Uyghur civil liberties.

Campaign 
In response to growing tensions between Han Chinese and the Uyghur population of Xinjiang itself, the recruitment of Uyghurs to fight in the Syrian Civil War, and several terrorist attacks orchestrated by Uyghur separatists, in early 2014, Chinese authorities in Xinjiang launched the renewed "strike hard" campaign around New Year. It included measures targeting mobile phones, computers, and religious materials belonging to Uyghurs. The government simultaneously announced a "people's war on terror" and local government introduced new restrictions that included the banning of long beards and the wearing of veils in public places.Scholars have stated that the most pervasive of the repressive measures in Xinjiang may be the government's use of digital mass surveillance systems. Authorities collect the DNA, iris scans, and voice samples of the Uyghur population, regularly scan the contents of their digital devices, use digitally coded ID cards to track their movements, and train CCTV cameras on their homes, streets, and marketplaces.

Criticism 
China has received criticism for its mass detention of members of the Muslim Uyghur community from few countries as well as human rights observers. James A Millward, a scholar who has researched Xinjiang for three decades, declared that the "state repression in Xinjiang has never been as severe as it has become since early 2017". The US State Department has said it is deeply concerned over China's "worsening crackdown" on minority Muslims in Xinjiang and the Trump administration has reportedly considered sanctions against senior Chinese officials and companies linked to allegations of human rights abuses. Canadian officials have also raised concern in Beijing and at the United Nations about the internment camps: "We are gravely concerned about the lack of transparency and due process in the cases of the many thousands of Uyghurs detained in so-called 're-education camps', which continues to call into question China's commitment to the rule of law and which violate its international human rights obligations."

Chinese government response 
Chinese leader Xi Jinping stated in May 2014 that "practice has proved that our party's ruling strategy in Xinjiang is correct and must be maintained in the long run".

In November 2018, a UN panel condemned China's "deteriorating" human rights record in Tibet and Xinjiang. The Chinese government replied saying that such international condemnation was "politically motivated". Vice foreign minister Le Yucheng responded, "We will not accept the politically driven accusations from a few countries that are fraught with biases, with total disregard for facts. No country shall dictate the definition of democracy and human rights." China has defended the strike-hard campaign as lawful, asserting that the country is a victim of terror, and that Uyghur men are pulled by global jihadi ideology rather than driven by grievances at home. The Chinese government denies the internment camps are for the purposes of re-education.

See also 
 Civil Servant-Family Pair Up
 Xinjiang conflict
 Uyghur genocide

References 

Cultural assimilation
Human rights of ethnic minorities in China
Islam in China
Linguistic discrimination
Language policy in Xinjiang
Anti-Islam sentiment in China
Political repression in China
Racism in China
Separatism in China
Violence against Muslims
Xinjiang conflict
Religious persecution by communists
Counterterrorism in China